The Michael Jackson Video Vanguard Award, also known as the Video Vanguard Award or the Lifetime Achievement Award, is a merit given to recording artists and music video directors at the MTV Video Music Awards (VMAs), a ceremony that was established in 1984. It is presented by MTV for "outstanding contributions" and "profound impact" on music video and popular culture. As the ceremony's special category, the trophy is a gold-plated "moonman" rather than the silver ones of the other VMA categories. The Beatles and director Richard Lester were honored with the Video Vanguard Award at the inaugural VMAs for "essentially inventing the music video." David Bowie also received the award at the same ceremony. Two years later, Madonna became the first female recipient. In 1991, the award was renamed after Michael Jackson, who had previously won the 1988 trophy.

It was presented as the Lifetime Achievement Award at the 2003 VMAs to Duran Duran and in 2006 as the Video Vanguard Award to director Hype Williams. Following Jackson's death, the award returned with his name restored in 2011. According to MTV, his name was attached to the award due to "Jackson's groundbreaking work as a video artist." This naming again caused controversy after the release of Leaving Neverland (2019), a documentary about alleged child sexual abuse by Jackson. As in previous ceremonies, MTV did not explicitly display Jackson's name on the television broadcast of the 2019 VMAs, although the year's recipient, Missy Elliott, did mention him in her speech and MTV issued documents keeping Jackson's name. Nicki Minaj is the most recent recipient of the award at the 2022 MTV Video Music Awards.

Since its inception, the Video Vanguard Award has been awarded to 34 acts, with most of them being of American or British Commonwealth origin, except Zbigniew Rybczyński (1986, Polish) and U2 (2001, Irish). Out of all the winners, nine acts have also won the VMAs' biggest prize Video of the Year, including Peter Gabriel and Justin Timberlake, who both earned the two awards in the same night. Since 2013 recipients are invited to perform a medley of hits leading up to their acceptance speech.

Recipients

See also
 Billboard Icon Award
 Brit Award for Outstanding Contribution to Music
 Grammy Lifetime Achievement Award

References

Citations

Book sources

External links
 
 MTV VMAs' Video Vanguard Award Recipients at E! Online

MTV Video Music Awards
Awards established in 1984
Lifetime achievement awards
Video Vanguard Award
Naming controversies